Oreta loochooana is a moth in the family Drepanidae first described by Charles Swinhoe in 1902. It is found in Japan, Korea, mainland China, Taiwan and the Russian Far East.

The wingspan is 30–37 mm.

The larvae feed on the leaves of Viburnum odoratissimum and Viburnum luzonicus var. formosanum. Pupation takes place on the leaf surface.

Subspecies
Oreta loochooana loochooana (Taiwan, Korea, Russian Far East, Japan: Ryukyus, China: Shandong, Henan, Shaanxi, Gansu)
Oreta loochooana timutia Watson, 1967 (China: Zhejiang, Hubei, Jiangxi, Hunan, Fujian, Guangdong, Guangxi, Sichuan, Chongqing, Yunnan)

References

Moths described in 1902
Drepaninae
Moths of Japan